The 1941 Nobel Prize in Literature was not awarded due to the ongoing World War II that started in September 1, 1939. Instead, the prize money was allocated with 1/3 to the Main Fund and with 2/3 to the Special Fund of this prize section. This was the fifth occasion in Nobel history that the prize was not conferred.

Nominations
Despite no author(s) being awarded for the 1941 prize due to the ongoing second world war, a number of literary critics, societies and academics continued sending nominations to the Nobel Committee of the Swedish Academy, hoping that their nominated candidate may be considered for the prize. In total, the academy received 21 nominations for 15 individuals.

Three of the nominees were nominated first-time namely Manoel Wanderley, Ruth Comfort Young, and Branislav Petronijević. The highest number of the nominations – three nominations – was for the Danish author Johannes Vilhelm Jensen, who was awarded in 1944. Four of the nominees were women namely Gabriela Mistral (awarded in 1945), Henriette Charasson, Maria Madalena de Martel Patrício, and Ruth Comfort Young.

The authors Alexander Afinogenov, Sherwood Anderson, Oskar Baum, Mihály Babits, Tadeusz Boy-Żeleński, Karin Boye, Robert Byron, José de la Cuadra, Penelope Delta, William Arthur Dunkerley, James Joyce, Émile Nelligan, Banjo Paterson, Elizabeth Madox Roberts, Norberto Romualdez, Hasegawa Shigure, Gertrude Eileen Trevelyan, Marina Tsvetaeva, Evelyn Underhill, Elizabeth von Arnim, Benjamin Lee Whorf, Virginia Woolf, and May Ziadeh died in 1941 without having been nominated for the prize.

References

1941
Cultural history of World War II